Minnesota State Highway 39 (MN 39) is a short  highway in northeast Minnesota, which runs from its intersection with State Highway 23 (Commonwealth Avenue) in Duluth and continues east to its eastern terminus at the Wisconsin state line (at the Oliver Bridge), where it becomes Wisconsin Highway 105 upon entering the village of Oliver, Wisconsin.

The east end of Highway 39 crosses the Saint Louis River to Wisconsin, over the double-deck Oliver Bridge with a railroad track on the upper deck.

Highway 39 is also known as McCuen Street in the Gary–New Duluth neighborhood of Duluth.

Route description
State Highway 39 serves as a short route between Duluth and the village of Oliver, Wisconsin.

The route is legally defined as Legislative Route 213 in the Minnesota Statutes. It is not marked with this number.

History
Highway 39 was authorized on April 12, 1943.

From 1958 to 1973, Highway 39 had continued farther west, extending over present-day State Highway 210 through Jay Cooke State Park to then-U.S. Highway 61 (now State Highway 45) at Carlton.

The road deck on the Highway 39 / Highway 105 Oliver Bridge was originally a wooden deck. Modernization came in the year 2000 when both states' DOT (WisDOT and MnDOT) cooperated with the Duluth, Missabe and Iron Range Railway to jointly fund a reconstruction of the roadway surface, which now features a stronger steel and reinforced concrete deck.

Major intersections

References

039
Transportation in St. Louis County, Minnesota